Daniel Stephen Rose (born 21 February 1988) is an English footballer who plays as a midfielder for  club Darlington, where he is also a first-team coach.

A former captain of Manchester United Reserves, Rose joined Oxford United in 2007 following a four-month loan spell. He switched to Newport County the following year, and helped Newport to the Conference South title in 2009–10. He was sold to Fleetwood Town in January 2012, and was part of the side that won the Conference Premier title in 2011–12, before returning to Oxford in June 2013. After a short spell with Northampton Town in 2016, he spent three seasons at Portsmouth and one with Swindon Town before signing for Grimsby Town in 2020. He spent time on loan at Darlington in 2021–22 before joining on a permanent contract. He captained the England C team in 2012.

Club career

Manchester United
Rose began his career with Premier League giants Manchester United, spending five years at Old Trafford. Though he captained the Reserve side, he never played a senior game for the Red Devils.

He was loaned out to Oxford United in January 2007, and remained at the Kassam Stadium until the end of the 2006–07 season.

Oxford United

He impressed with his "sparkling displays" during his 22 Conference National appearances, and was signed on a month-to-month contract by manager Jim Smith in summer 2007. This came despite the Oxford Mails report that he was "being chased by a number of Championship and League One sides – making a return to Oxford United seem highly unlikely". He made 19 appearances in 2007–08, before moving on to Newport County of the Conference South.

Newport County
He scored 10 goals in 2008–09, as Dean Holdsworth's side finished a disappointing 10th. He made 40 starts in 2009–10; Newport were crowned Conference South champions with a record 103 points, 28 points ahead of second-placed Dover Athletic. He started 50 matches in 2010–11, in which season Newport missed out on the Conference Premier play-offs by four places and nine points. He made 25 appearances in 2011–12 before being signed by Fleetwood Town for an undisclosed fee in January 2012. The move came despite interest from Football League clubs Aldershot Town (managed by Dean Holdsworth) and Crystal Palace (where he had a week-long trial). He had scored a total of 36 goals in 165 appearances in all competitions for Newport, including a hat-trick past Kettering Town on 18 October 2011.

Fleetwood Town
Fleetwood won the Conference title in 2011–12, winning promotion to the Football League for the first time in the club's history.

In October 2012, Rose rejoined Dean Holdsworth at Aldershot Town on a three-month loan.

Return to Oxford United
On 13 June 2013, Rose joined Oxford United for the third time in his career. He signed a two-year-deal with an option of a third. On 1 February 2016 he left the club by mutual consent. He later signed for Northampton Town.

Northampton Town
On 1 February 2016, Rose completed a switch to Northampton Town, rejoining former Oxford manager Chris Wilder. He scored his first goal for the club in a 1–0 win over Wycombe Wanderers on 20 February 2016.

Portsmouth
On 3 June 2016, Rose joined Portsmouth. He scored his first goal for the club in a 5–1 win over Barnet on 24 September 2016. He was a key member of the team that won the League Two title in 2016–17. On 30 December 2017, in a match against Northampton Town, Rose broke his leg. The injury would see him sidelined for the remainder of the season, but he signed a one-year contract extension in March 2018. He made one further League appearance for the club in August.

Swindon Town
On 17 January 2019, Rose joined League Two club Swindon Town, signing a contract until the end of the 2018–19 season with the option of a further year. Rose signed a 1-year extension for the 2019–2020 season.

Grimsby Town
On 31 August 2020, Rose signed a two-year deal with Grimsby Town becoming Ian Holloway's sixth signing of the summer.

After Grimsby's relegation from the Football League at the end of the 2020–21 season, Rose was deemed surplus to requirements by manager Paul Hurst and was made available on a free transfer.

Rose was not handed a squad number for the 2021–22 season, and joined National League North club Darlington on a one-month loan on 8 October 2021. After he played three matches in the initial month, his loan was extended, first for a further two months and then to the end of the season.

On 12 May 2022, following his return from Darlington, it was announced that Grimsby would not be renewing his contract and that he would depart at the end of the season.

Grimsby secured promotion with victory in the play-off final, though Rose was not in the matchday squad at London Stadium.

Darlington
On the same day as his departure from Grimsby was announced, Darlington announced Rose would be joining on a permanent deal. Rose himself later announcing via Twitter that he was arriving in a player/coach capacity.

International career
Rose captained the England C team in a 1–1 draw with Italy at Highbury Stadium, Fleetwood, on 28 February 2012.

Statistics

Honours
Newport County
 Conference South: 2009–10
Fleetwood Town
 Conference Premier: 2011–12
Northampton Town
 League Two: 2015–16
Portsmouth
 League Two: 2016–17
Swindon Town
 League Two: 2019–20

References
General

Specific

External links

Profile at Fleetwood Town F.C. website

1988 births
Living people
Footballers from Bristol
English footballers
England semi-pro international footballers
Association football midfielders
Manchester United F.C. players
Oxford United F.C. players
Newport County A.F.C. players
Fleetwood Town F.C. players
Aldershot Town F.C. players
Portsmouth F.C. players
English Football League players
National League (English football) players
Northampton Town F.C. players
Swindon Town F.C. players
Grimsby Town F.C. players
Darlington F.C. players